Douglas Coutinho Gomes de Souza (born 8 February 1994) is a Brazilian footballer who plays as a striker for Vila Nova.

Career statistics

References

1994 births
Living people
Brazilian expatriate footballers
Association football forwards
Campeonato Brasileiro Série A players
Primeira Liga players
Club Athletico Paranaense players
Cruzeiro Esporte Clube players
S.C. Braga players
K League 2 players
Seoul E-Land FC players
UAE Pro League players
Fujairah FC players
Brazilian expatriate sportspeople in Portugal
Expatriate footballers in Portugal
Brazilian expatriate sportspeople in South Korea
Expatriate footballers in South Korea
Expatriate footballers in the United Arab Emirates
Brazilian expatriate sportspeople in the United Arab Emirates
Footballers from Rio de Janeiro (city)
Brazilian footballers